Al Garcia-Serra is a Cuban-American businessman. He has been founder and partner/COO/CEO of three marketing agencies, including Commonground/MGS,  marketing communications' first minority-owned holding company. The holding group has headquarters in New York with offices in Chicago, Houston, Los Angeles and Miami.

Early life

Born in Havana, Cuba, Garcia-Serra attended La Salle school in El Vedado, Havana, Cuba. He and his family, in 1960, immigrated to the United States, and settled in Miami, FL. He graduated from Coral Gables Senior High School in 1964, and then attended the University of Florida, from 1964-1968 where he earned a Bachelor of Science degree in Advertising. His first advertising job was at Compton/Saatchi & Saatchi Advertising as an assistant media buyer. Garcia-Serra returned to Miami in 1970 to work at Hume Smith Mickelberry as a print media buyer and account executive.

Career
Garcia-Serra's early career started in the mid-1950s when he and a colleague at La Salle school started a "rag" tabloid to compete with the official school newspaper. He sold his first ad to Coca-Cola, Cuba. Later, after arriving in Miami in the early 60s his first job was at Food Fair as bag boy/cashier. His first business enterprise was called "Magigrip", a local franchise of magnetic signs.

From 1970-1976 Garcia-Serra was at Flagler Federal Savings and Loan, then at Barnett Bank from 1976–77 and Omni International Mall for its Grand Opening from 1977-1981, after which he started his first advertising agency in 1982, Garcia-Serra Blanco (GSB:LINTAS), a part of Interpublic Group of Companies, which was recognized by Hispanic Business Magazine as the fastest-growing company in 1987.  

Garcia-Serra co-founded MGSCOMM with his friend and business partner Manuel E. Machado in 2003, a Minority Business Enterprise with headquarters in Miami, Florida, and offices in New York City and Mexico City. The independently owned marketing communications agency, which was the holding company for MGS, SWAY, PostMaster, and RunWild, ranked among the top 20 in the "2013 Advertising Age 50 Largest U.S. Hispanic Agencies", and was named among the top 100 in the "2012 Hispanic Business 500 Largest US Hispanic-Owned Companies".

Honors
In 2008, Garcia-Serra was awarded "Entrepreneur of the Year" from Hispanic Business.

References

1946 births
Living people
American chief executives